Secret Story - Casa dos Segredos: Desafio Final 3 was the third all-stars season with housemates from seasons 2 to 5 of the Portuguese version of the reality show Secret Story, which based on the original French version and of Big Brother. The season started on 4 January 2015, and ended on 22 February 2015, making it the longest Desafio Final season so far. The prize is €15,000. The season was officially confirmed on 30 November 2014 when season 5 was airing, and it was given 3 passes to this season on that date. Portugal is the third country worldwide to have three all-star seasons of the format.

Housemates

Alexandra 
Alexandra Ferreira was a housemate in Secret Story 3, Desafio Final 1, and Desafio Final 2. She entered on Day 29.
 Results:
 Secret Story 3: She was the 16th housemate to be evicted on Secret Story 3 alongside Tatiana against Jean-Mark and Mara with 34% of the vote.
 Secret Story: Desafio Final 1: She walked on Day 15 after Wilson was evicted.
 Secret Story: Desafio Final 2: She walked on Day 18 after seeing an airplane banner sent by her boyfriend urging her to leave.
 Secret Story: Desafio Final 3: She was the 10th housemate to be evicted with 53% of the vote against Carlos and Débora.

Carlos 
Carlos Sousa was a housemate in Secret Story 2 and Desafio Final 1. He entered on Day 1.
 Results:
 Secret Story 2: He was the 7th housemate to be evicted on Secret Story 2, against João J. and Marco with 50% of the votes.
 Secret Story: Desafio Final 1: He was the 5th Finalist in the Final of Desafio Final 1 with 5% of the votes to win.
 Secret Story: Desafio Final 3: He was the 4th Finalist with 13% of the votes to win.

Cátia 
Cátia Palhinha was a housemate in Secret Story 2, Desafio Final 1, and Big Brother VIP 3. She entered on Day 1.
 Results:
 Secret Story 2: She was the 2nd Finalist of Secret Story 2 with 28% of the votes to win.
 Secret Story: Desafio Final 1: She was the winner of Desafio Final 1 with 56% of the votes to win.
 Big Brother VIP 3: She was the 10th housemate to be evicted on Big Brother VIP 3, against Kapinha and Pedro with 72% of the votes.
 Secret Story: Desafio Final 3: She was the 14th housemate to be evicted against all the other housemates with 2% of the votes to save.

Cátia Marisa 
Cátia Marisa Vaz was a housemate in Secret Story 3. She entered on Day 23.
 Results:
 Secret Story 3: She was the 2nd housemate to be evicted on Secret Story 3, against Petra with 81% of the votes.
 Secret Story: Desafio Final 3: She was the 6th housemate to be ejected after being swapped for Alexandra.

Cláudio 
Cláudio Viana Fernandes was a housemate in Secret Story 3, Desafio Final 1, and Desafio Final 2. He entered on Day 15.
 Results:
 Secret Story 3: He was the 4th Finalist in the Final of Secret Story 3 with 10% of the vote to win.
 Secret Story: Desafio Final 1: He was the 2nd housemate evicted on Desafio Final 1 alongside Susana against Ricardo with 39% of the vote.
 Secret Story: Desafio Final 2: He was the 3rd housemate to be ejected from Desafio Final 2 on Day 21 after showing violent behavior towards Jéssica.
 Secret Story: Desafio Final 3: He was the 4th housemate to be ejected by A Voz after losing a duel against Marco.

Cristiana 
Cristiana Dionísio was a housemate in Secret Story 5. She entered on Day 1.
 Results:
 Secret Story 5: She was the 16th housemate to be evicted on Secret Story 5 against all the other housemates with 6% of the votes to save.
 Secret Story: Desafio Final 3: She was the 2nd Finalist with 17% of the votes to win.

Daniel 
Daniel Gregório was a housemate in Secret Story 5. He entered on Day 5.
 Results:
 Secret Story 5: He was the 15th housemate to be evicted on Secret Story 5, against Bruno and Elisabete with 67% of the votes.
 Secret Story: Desafio Final 3: He was the 4th housemate to be evicted against Cristiana and Wilson with 51% of the vote.

Débora 
Débora Picoito was a housemate in Secret Story 4 and Desafio Final 2. She entered on Day 8.
 Results:
 Secret Story 4: She was the 9th housemate to be evicted on Secret Story 4, against Bernardina and Érica with 72% of the votes.
 Secret Story: Desafio Final 2: She was the 4th Finalist in the Final of Desafio Final 2 with 5% of the votes to win.
 Secret Story: Desafio Final 3: She was the 13th housemate evicted against Cristiana with 61% of the votes.

Diana 
Diana Ferreira was a housemate in Secret Story 4. She entered on Day 15.
 Results:
 Secret Story 4: She was the 7th housemate evicted on Secret Story 4 against Bruno and João with 54% of the vote.
 Secret Story: Desafio Final 3: She was the 9th housemate evicted with 37% of the vote against Cátia, Cristiana and Paulo.

Diogo 
Diogo Marcelino was a housemate in Secret Story 4. He entered on Day 1.
 Results:
 Secret Story 4: He was the 3rd Finalist of Secret Story 4 with 12% of the votes to win.
 Secret Story: Desafio Final 3: He walked on Day 24 because he felt bored in the house.

Érica 
Érica Silva was a housemate in Secret Story 4 and Desafio Final 2. She was given a pass to Desafio Final by the housemates that were still in the house at the moment, who chose her between the finalists of Secret Story 4.
 Results:
 Secret Story 4: She was the 4th Finalist in the Final of Secret Story 4, with 8% of the votes to win.
 Secret Story: Desafio Final 2: She was the winner in the Final of Secret Story: Desafio Final 2, with 58% of the votes to win.
 Secret Story: Desafio Final 3: She was the 8th housemate to be evicted against Diana and Sofia with 73% of the vote.

Fábio 
Fábio Machado was a housemate in Secret Story 3 and Desafio Final 2. He entered on Day 1.
 Results:
 Secret Story 3: He was the 14th housemate to be evicted on Secret Story 3, against Jean-Mark with 53% of the votes.
 Secret Story: Desafio Final 2: He was the 7th housemate to be evicted on Desafio Final 2 alongside Mara after losing all challenges to become a finalist.
 Secret Story: Desafio Final 3: He was the 3rd housemate to be ejected from the house because "A Voz" chose to replace him with Cláudio.

Fernando 
Fernando Pereira was a housemate in Secret Story 5. He entered on Day 1.
 Results:
 Secret Story 5: He was the 13th housemate to be evicted on Secret Story 5, against Liliana with 78% of the vote.
 Secret Story: Desafio Final 3: He was the 1st housemate to be evicted alongside Odin against Carlos and Diogo with 63% of the votes.

Jéssica 
Jéssica Gomes was a housemate in Secret Story 3 and Desafio Final 2. She entered on Day 8.
 Results:
 Secret Story 3: She was the 5th Finalist in the Final of Secret Story 3 with 5% of the votes to win.
 Secret Story: Desafio Final 2: She was the 2nd Finalist of Desafio Final 2 with 28% of the votes to win.
 Secret Story: Desafio Final 3: She was the 7th housemate to be evicted against Carlos, Cristiana, and Débora with 39% of the vote.

Joana 
Joana Diniz was a housemate in Secret Story 4 and Desafio Final 2. She entered on Day 1 and is competing as one housemate with Luís until Day 9 when she started to compete individually.
 Results:
 Secret Story 4: She was the 5th Finalist in the Final of Secret Story 4 with 3% of the votes to win.
 Secret Story: Desafio Final 2: She was the 5th housemate to be evicted on Desafio Final 2 alongside Rúben B & Tatiana against Tiago with 26% of the votes.
 Secret Story: Desafio Final 3: She was the 11th housemate to be evicted with 52% of the vote against Cátia, Débora and Sofia.

Joana P.
Joana Pinto was a housemate in Secret Story 3 and Desafio Final 1. She entered on Day 36.
 Results:
 Secret Story 3: She was the 6th housemate to be evicted on Secret Story 3 with 84% of the vote against Petra and Tatiana.
 Secret Story: Desafio Final 1: She was the 6th housemate to be evicted on Desafio Final 1, alongside Sandra with 21% of the vote against Ricardo.
 Secret Story: Desafio Final 3: She was the 8th housemate to be ejected after the housemates voted her out against Alexandra.

João
João Paulo Sousa was a housemate in Secret Story 4 and Desafio Final 2. He entered on Day 10.
 Results:
 Secret Story 4: He was the 8th housemate to be evicted on Secret Story 4, against Bruno and Joana with 58% of the vote.
 Secret Story: Desafio Final 2: He was the 5th Finalist in the Final of Desafio Final 2 with 3% of the vote to win.
 Secret Story: Desafio Final 3: He was the 5th housemate to be ejected by A Voz after losing a duel against Érica.

Liliana 
Liliana Antunes was a housemate in Secret Story 5. She entered on Day 1.
 Results:
 Secret Story 5: She was the 14th housemate to be evicted on Secret Story 5, against Elisabete and Flávia with 48% of the votes.
 Secret Story: Desafio Final 3: She was the 5th housemate to be evicted against Cátia and Cristiana with 55% of the vote.

Luís 
Luís Nascimento was a housemate in Secret Story 4. He entered on Day 1 and is competing as one housemate with Joana until Day 9 when he started to compete individually.
 Results:
 Secret Story 4: He was the winner of Secret Story 4 with 47% of the votes to win.
 Secret Story: Desafio Final 3: He was the 5th Finalist with 10% of the votes to win.

Marco 
Marco Costa was a housemate in Secret Story 2 and Desafio Final 1. He was given a pass to Desafio Final from Bruno, who decided not to enter the season lately. He entered on Day 1.
 Results:
 Secret Story 2: He was the 5th Finalist in the Final of Secret Story 2 with 7% of the votes to win.
 Secret Story: Desafio Final 1: He was the 3rd Finalist in the Final of Desafio Final 1 with 9% of the votes to win.
 Secret Story: Desafio Final 3: He was the 7th housemate to be ejected and was swapped for Paulo.

Odin 
Odin Kreuwitchz was a housemate in Secret Story 5. He entered on Day 1.
 Results:
 Secret Story 5: He was the 10th housemate to be evicted on Secret Story 5, against Fernando and Ricardo with 65% of the votes.
 Secret Story: Desafio Final 3: He was the 2nd housemate evicted alongside Fernando against Carlos and Diogo with 18% of the votes.

Paulo 
Paulo Rosa was a housemate in Secret Story 2. He entered on Day 29.
 Results:
 Secret Story 2: He was the 11th housemate to be evicted on Secret Story 2, against João J. with 75% of the vote.
 Secret Story: Desafio Final 3: He was the 12th housemate to be evicted against Luís with 58% of the vote.

Pedro 
Pedro Infante was a housemate in Secret Story 5. He entered on Day 1.
 Results:
 Secret Story 5: He was the 4th Finalist in the Final of Secret Story 5 with 14% of the votes to win.
 Secret Story: Desafio Final 3: He was the 2nd housemate to be ejected from the house because "A Voz" chose to replace him with Débora and Jéssica.

Ricardo 
Ricardo Azevedo was a housemate in Secret Story 2 and Desafio Final 1. He entered on Day 1.
 Results:
 Secret Story 2: He was the 9th housemate to be evicted on Secret Story 2, against Miguel and Paulo with 51% of the votes.
 Secret Story: Desafio Final 1: He was the 2nd Finalist in the Final of Desafio Final 1 with 20% of the votes to win.
 Secret Story: Desafio Final 3: He was the 3rd housemate to be evicted against Fábio and Liliana with 59% of the vote.

Sofia 
Sofia Sousa was a housemate in Secret Story 4. She entered on Day 1.
 Results:
 Secret Story 4: She was the 2nd Finalist in the Final of Secret Story 4 with 30% of the votes to win.
 Secret Story: Desafio Final 3: She was the winner of Secret Story: Desafio Final 3 with 44% of the votes to win.

Tierry 
Tierry Vilson was a housemate in Secret Story 4 and Desafio Final 2. He entered on Day 1.
 Results:
 Secret Story 4: He walked from Secret Story 4 on Day 37.
 Secret Story: Desafio Final 2: He was the 3rd Finalist in the Final of Desafio Final 2 with 6% of the votes to win.
 Secret Story: Desafio Final 3: He was the 1st housemate to be ejected from the house because "A Voz" chose to replace him with Daniel.

Vânia 
Vânia Sá was a housemate in Secret Story 5. She was given a pass to Desafio Final by the finalists of Secret Story 4, who chose her between the housemates that had already left the house.
 Results:
 Secret Story 5: She was the 7th housemate to be evicted from Secret Story 5, against Cinthia and Agnes with 52% of the votes.
 Secret Story: Desafio Final 3: She was the 6th housemate to be evicted against Érica and Joana with 53% of the vote.

Wilson 
Wilson Teixeira was a housemate in Secret Story 3 and Desafio Final 1. He entered on Day 1.
 Results:
 Secret Story 3: He was ejected from Secret Story 3 on Day 54.
 Secret Story: Desafio Final 1: He was the 4th housemate to be evicted in Desafio Final 1, along with Nuno against Joana and Ricardo with 35% of the votes.
 Secret Story: Desafio Final 3: He was the 3rd Finalist with 16% of the votes to win.

Secrets 
In this All-Stars season, there are two secrets: house's secret and A Voz's secret.

Notes

 The prize was originally €2,500. Housemates draw a number in which they would reveal their guess. For each wrong guess, it would be retired €100 from the amount. Everyone failed exempt Wilson, who was the last to show his guess. Therefore, he only won €1,700.
 The prize was originally a pass to the final. However, as the show was close to the final, "A Voz" decided that the €800 previously lost would be in play. Housemates draw a number in which they would reveal their guess. Carlos was the first to correctly answer, therefore won €800.

Nominations table

Notes

 : "A Voz" automatically nominated four males. It was a double eviction.
 : "A Voz" automatically nominated four housemates from each season of Secret Story. The rest of the housemates then voted to save one of the nominated housemates.
 :  Tierry was ejected because "A Voz" chose to replace him with Daniel.
 : Joana and Luis votes counted as one until this round. On Day 9 "A Voz" decided that they would compete individually since then.
 :  Carlos and Érica were the most voted by the other housemates to win an immunity.
 :  Pedro was ejected because "A Voz" chose to replace him with Débora and Jéssica.
 : "A Voz" automatically nominated four housemates. The rest of the housemates (except the last nominees) then voted to save one of the nominated housemates.
 : For this nominations, males nominate female housemates. In the first round, Cristiana and Liliana tied with 2 votes each and Liliana was nominated by the males in a tiebreaker. In the second round, Cátia and Cristiana received 2 votes each and became the other nominees. Nominations were done face-to-face both in the first and second rounds.
 :  Fábio was ejected because "A Voz" chose to replace him with Cláudio.
 : For this nominations, males nominate female housemates in the first round. Érica and Vânia tied with 2 votes each and Vânia was nominated by the males in a tiebreaker. In the second round, females nominate another female. Érica and Joana received 2 votes each and became the other nominees. Nominations were done face-to-face both in the first and second rounds.
 :  On Day 24, Cláudio, Jéssica, Carlos and João lost challenges against Marco, Diana, Cristiana and Érica, respectively, and were threatened with eviction. On Day 26, "A Voz" decided eject Cláudio and João and nominate Carlos and Jéssica automatically.
 : "A Voz" automatically nominated four housemates. The rest of the housemates (except those already nominated) then voted to save one of the nominated housemates in two rounds.
 :  Cátia Marisa was ejected after "A Voz" chose between her or Diana to leave. Diana received the most votes to stay by the housemates and Cátia Marisa was replaced by Alexandra. After the Gala, Marco was ejected too and replaced with Paulo.
 : For this nominations, all housemates nominated a female in two rounds. Diana, Érica, Joana and Sofia were the most voted and were up for eviction. The other housemates voted to save one of them. Joana received the most votes to save, leaving Diana, Érica and Sofia as this week's nominees.
 : For this nominations, all housemates nominated in three rounds. In the first round, Cátia and Wilson tied with 2 votes each and Cátia was nominated in a tiebreaker. In the third round Alexandra, Débora and Wilson tied with 2 votes each and Alexandra was nominated in a tiebreaker. Alexandra, Cátia, Cristiana, Diana, Paulo and Sofia were the most voted after the three rounds and were up for eviction. "A Voz" decided to save Alexandra and Sofia from nominations, leaving Cátia, Cristiana, Diana and Paulo as this week's nominees.
 :  Joana P. was ejected after received the most votes to leave by the housemates. They had to choose between her or Alexandra for being the last females to enter the House.
 : All housemates were nominated and to be saved they competed in several tasks. Alexandra, Carlos, Débora and Luís lost their tasks and were up for eviction. Agnes and Bruno (ex-housemates of Secret Story 5) voted to save Luís from the eviction, leaving Alexandra, Carlos and Débora as this round's nominees.
 : For this nominations, all housemates nominated a female. The males directly nominated one female and the females nominated another female in two rounds.
 : For this nominations, only the male housemates nominated another male.
 : For this nominations, only the female housemates nominated another female.
 : This round there were no nominations and all housemates are up for eviction. It is also a vote to save rather than evict.
 : For the final, the public voted for the housemate they want to win.

Nominations total received

Nominations: Results

Twists

Passes 
On Day 71 of Secret Story 5, it was given 3 passes to the next Desafio Final.

The first one was given to Bruno, the finalists of Secret Story 4 chose him between the housemates that were still in the house. At first, there was a tie between Bruno and Pedro. In the tie-breaker round, everyone voted the same exempt Sofia, who voted for Bruno. However, Bruno decided later to not enter and gave his pass to Marco.

The second one was given to Érica, the housemates still in the house chose her between the finalists of Secret Story 4.

The third one was given to Vânia, the finalists of Secret Story 4 chose her between the housemates that had already left the house.

Houseguests

Swap of housemates 
The swap of housemates twist started on Day 5. It consists of ejecting one housemate and switch him/her for a new housemate.

Vote to save 
On Day 5, housemates had to vote for a boy and a girl to win immunity. The boy and the girl with the most votes would win immunity. Joana & Luís could be voted in both votes, and if one was the most votes the other would automatically win immunity too. The nominees couldn't be voted.

On the girls' vote, there was a tie between, Érica, Joana and Cátia. In the tie-breaker tie, there was again a tie between Érica and Joana. To break the tie, the boys had to agree who would win immunity. They decided to give it to Érica.

On the boys vote, Carlos had the most votes and won immunity too.

On Day 29, Alexandra entered the House, however one housemate had to leave the house too. "A Voz" gave the options of either Diana or Cátia Marisa to leave the House. The housemates then voted between them for who should stay. Alexandra couldn't vote as the swap involved her. Cátia Marisa received the fewest votes and therefore was ejected.

On Day 31, Érica, Diana, Sofia and Joana were initially nominated. However, the other housemates had to vote to save one of them face-to-face. Joana received the most votes and was saved.

Vote to enter 
On Day 36, Pedro, João and Joana P. entered the House and housemates had to vote to one of them stay in the House. There was a tie between Pedro and Joana P., therefore "A Voz" broke the tie, decided that Joana P. should stay in the House. Pedro and João had then to leave the house.

On Day 38, Sofia, Cátia, Paulo, Diana, Cristiana and Alexandra were initially nominated. However, "A Voz" decided to save Sofia and Alexandra from the list of nominees.

Fake nominations 
On Day 10, the girls had to fake nominate a boy. The nomination was done face-to-face. Wilson would have been nominated if the nominations were true.

On Day 47, housemates fake nominated in two rounds, each face-to-face. In the first round, everyone nominated a girl. Sofia would be nominated if it was real. In the second round, everyone nominated a boy. Wilson would be nominated if it was real.

Fake evictions 
On Day 10, "A Voz" told the housemates that Vânia had been evicted to swap with João, the new housemate. However, she wasn't evicted and moved to the Secret Room, being immune and exempt to nominate. She re-entered the House after the nominations.

On Day 17, "A Voz" told the housemates all the girls had been automatically nominated and one of them would be evicted. Cristiana was then informed to have been evicted, however, she wasn't and moved to the Secret Room, being immune and exempt to nominate. She re-entered the house the day after, Day 18.

On Day 29, Carlos was fake evicted and went to the studio. However the public didn't know the results yet, so Carlos watched the results in the studio. After knowing, Carlos connected to the House and revealed that it was Jéssica who had been evicted.

On Day 40, each housemate voted to fake evict another. Sofia received the most votes, however "A Voz" revealed that it was fake, and she stayed in the House.

Sheriff of the Week 
Starting on Day 29, a new game called Sheriff of the Week was introduced. The winner of this game would win €1000 and would be the leader of the House during the week. However, this twist was only used twice. Everyone could participate exempt the nominees of the week.

 On Day 29 (Week 5), housemates were firstly divided into 3 groups for the first round (Blue - Érica, Marco & Alexandra, Red - Luís, Diana & Wilson and Green - Joana, Cátia & Sofia). Marco, Luís and Joana won on their respective groups and advanced to the final round. In this round, whoever stayed more time in a platform would win. Luís stayed more time, therefore was the Sheriff of the Week.
 On Day 36 (Week 6), housemates were firstly divided into 2 groups for the first round (girls and boys). Cristiana and Paulo won on their respective groups and advanced to the final round. In this round, who did the challenge in the fewest time would win. Paulo did in faster, therefore was the Sheriff of the Week.

Surprise ejection 
On Day 43 after Diana's eviction, it was revealed that someone else would leave the House then. "A Voz" automatically nominated Alexandra and Joana P. for being the two last housemates to enter the house, and all the other housemates had to vote for who they wanted to evict. Joana P. received the most votes and was ejected.

Ratings

Live Shows 

* The final 5 nominations/eviction shows took place every day throughout the week

External links 
 Official Website 
 Fan Website 

Desafio Final 3
2015 Portuguese television seasons